Big Boo may refer to:

Big Boo, larger and stronger version of Boo, a ghost in some video games from the Mario franchise
Carrie "Big Boo" Black, a character played by Lea DeLaria in the television series Orange Is the New Black (2013)

See also
Boo (disambiguation)
 Big Bad Boo, Canadian production company
 Big Bam Boo, 1980s British pop/rock duo
 Boo Boo (disambiguation)
 "Bug a Boo", 1999 single by US pop group Destiny's Child